Roderick Devon "Rod" Wright (born July 3, 1952) is an American Democratic politician who previously represented California's 35th State Senate district until his resignation on September 22, 2014. He previously represented the 25th district from 2008-2012. Wright also represented California's 48th State Assembly district from 1996 until he was term limited in 2002.

Education and pre-legislative career
Senator Wright obtained his degree in Urban Studies and City Planning at Pepperdine University.

Prior to  his initial entrance into elected office in 1996, Senator Wright was the District Director to Congresswoman Maxine Waters where he assisted citizens with federal matters such as Social Security, Medi-Care and veterans issues among others.

Legislative career
Wright was then elected to the California State Assembly in 1996 representing the 48th Assembly District covering much of south Los Angeles County. From 1998 until 2002, Wright served as Chair of the Assembly Committee on Utilities and Commerce (U&C) which held legislative jurisdiction over electricity, natural gas, telecommunications, private water corporations and other issues related to commerce. Wright has been recognized for his work in the areas of public safety, education, energy and utilities, small business, family law and consumer privacy.

2008 primary
Entering the 2008 primary season, Wright had been out of politics for six years and was initially not considered a strong candidate against the front runner, former Lieutenant Governor and Congressman Mervyn Dymally. However, with his own fundraising and help from independent expenditure groups, Wright was able to overcome his lack of name recognition in the area – most of the area Wright represented in the California State Assembly is in California's 26th Senate District.

2010 harassment settlement
In April 2010, California Senate leaders secretly approved a $120,000 settlement in a harassment claim against Wright.

2010 indictment and 2014 conviction
In September 2010, a Los Angeles County grand jury unsealed an eight-count felony indictment against state Sen. Roderick Wright accusing him of filing a false declaration of candidacy, voter fraud and perjury beginning in 2007, when he changed his voter registration to run for the Legislature.

Wright was convicted of eight counts of voter fraud on January 28, 2014. In September, he was sentenced to ninety days' confinement and banned from public office for the rest of his life.

Wright resigned from the State Senate on September 22, 2014.

Pardon
On November 21, 2018, Jerry Brown, Governor of California, pardoned Wright.

References

External links

Join California Rod Wright

|-

|-

1952 births
Living people
African-American state legislators in California
Democratic Party California state senators
Democratic Party members of the California State Assembly
Pepperdine University alumni
People of the African Methodist Episcopal church
People from Inglewood, California
Politicians from Chicago
American politicians convicted of fraud
California politicians convicted of crimes
21st-century American politicians
20th-century American politicians